Menander II Dikaios (epithet means "the Just") may have been an Indo-Greek King who ruled in the areas of Arachosia and Gandhara in the north of modern Pakistan. However, since he is entirely known through his coins, this may have just been a separate set of coins issued by Menander I with a different epithet.

Time of reign
Bopearachchi has suggested that Menander II reigned c. 90–85 BC, whereas R. C. Senior has suggested c. 65 BC. In that case, Menander II ruled remaining Indo-Greek territories in Gandhara after the invasion of Maues.

Relations to other kings
Menander II Dikaios may have belonged to the dynasty of Menander I Soter, the greatest of the Indo-Greek kings. It was long believed that there was only one king named Menander (see discussion under Menander I) as their portraits were rather similar and Menander II seems to have been a devout Buddhist, just as Menander I was, according to the ancient Buddhist scripture the Milindapanha.

On the other hand, the name Menander could well have been popular in the Indo-Greek kingdom, and the coins of Menander II are not very like those of Menander I nor of those other kings (such as Strato I) who are believed to have belonged to his dynasty. R. C. Senior links Menander II with the Indo-Greek king Amyntas, with whom he shares several monograms and also facial features such as a pointed nose and receding chin. He also suggests a close relation to the semi-Scythian king Artemidorus, son of Maues, since their coins use similar types and are often found together.

There is a small possibility that Menander II, rather than Menander I, is actually the Buddhist Greek king referred to in the Milinda Panha. This point is unsolved however, since Greek sources (Plutarch (Praec. reip. ger. 28, 6)) relate that the great conqueror Menander I is the one who received the honour of burial in what could be interpreted as Buddhist stupas.

More likely, Menander I may indeed have first supported Buddhism, like the other Indo-Greek kings, and was probably the protagonist of the Milindapanha, on account of his described fame, whereas Menander II, a minor king, may have wholeheartedly embraced Buddhism, as exemplified by his coins.

Coins of Menander II

 
The coins of Menander II bear the mention "Menander the Just", and "King of the Dharma" in Kharoshti, suggesting that he adopted the Buddhist faith. Menander II struck only Indian silver. These depict the king in diadem or helmet of the type of Menander I, with a number of reverses:
a king on horseback, Nike and a sitting Zeus of the type of Antialkidas and Amyntas Nikator, but with an eight-spoked Buddhist wheel instead of the small elephant.

His bronzes feature Athena standing, with spear and palm-branch, shield at her feet, making a benediction gesture with the right hand, similar to the Buddhist vitarka mudra.  Other varieties feature a king performing the same gesture.

On the reverse is a lion, symbol of Buddhism, as also seen on the pillars of the Mauryan King Ashoka. In general, the coins of Menander II are quite few, which tends to indicate a rather small rule.

A contemporary king to represent the Buddhist lion on his coins is the Indo-Scythian king Maues, around 85 BC.

References

Further reading 
 The Shape of Ancient Thought. Comparative studies in Greek and Indian Philosophies by Thomas McEvilley (Allworth Press and the School of Visual Arts, 2002) 
 Buddhism in Central Asia by B.N. Puri (Motilal Banarsidass Pub, January 1, 2000) 
 The Greeks in Bactria and India, W.W. Tarn, Cambridge University Press.

External links
 Coin India gallery
 Coins of Menander II

Indo-Greek kings
1st-century BC rulers in Asia
Greek Buddhist monarchs
Euthydemid dynasty